Osei Kofi Tutu I ( – ) was one of the founders of the Ashanti Empire, assisted by Okomfo Anokye. The Asante are an Akan ethnic group of West Africa. Osei Tutu led an alliance of Asante states against the regional hegemon, the Denkyira, completely defeating them. He ruled the Kumaseman State between c.1680/c.1695-1701 (he was definitely Kumasehene by 1695) and he ruled the Ashanti Empire from late 1701-c.1717.

Asantemansu, Kwaaman, Amantoo and Kumase states 
It is unclear about who out of Oti Akenten, Obiri Yeboa and Osei Tutu founded Kumase, or at least had its name changed. This is because Kwaaman is in the same place as Kumase (Kwaaman is Kumase). Most accounts tell that it was Osei Tutu who, with the help of Akomfo Anokye, founded Kumasi after growing trees in 3 places and seeing which tree grew the best.

However, it is also said that it was Obiri Yeboa who founded Kumase in an attempt to move his capital away from his Denkyrian overlords, which makes sense as he was the first hene to form the "Asante" (It wasn't called the Asante yet) coalition against the Dormaa.

But then there's Oti Akenten, who waged a series of successful military operations against neighbouring Akan states, bringing a larger surrounding territory into alliance with the Kwaaman state, which can also be known as the Kumaseman state from this point forwards. This suggests that the chief settlement of Kwaaman has already been renamed Kumasi or Kumase and that the tale of its founding by Osei Tutu has been lifted from earlier tradition.

This is supported with the fact that Oti Akenten was the first hene to proclaim himself the hene of all people who would eventually become the Asante.

It is widely agreed that Obiri Yeboa was the first hene to bring together the states together in a confederation either called the Amantoo confederation, or the Kwaaman clan states, with the capital of this new alliance being Kwaaman, with Osei Tutu renaming it due to the kum tree that Tutu sat under while negotiating the terms for the land

The first time we hear the term Asante in history is out of the mouth of the king of Denkyira, Ntim Gyakari before his execution. He utters "esa nti" which means "because of war". He said this because it was because of war with the Denkyiras that the Akan city states that would form the Asante Union joined.

The Amantoo was the region of Akan-speaking peoples, with almost all of the chiefs of the Amantoo belonged to the same clan, which gave them an idea of a union of peoples was already instilled.

Early life

Birth 
The man to be the person to be the creator of the Asante Empire was born Osei Kofi Tutu Opemsoo in around 1660 in the town of Kokofu Anyinam, in the eastern region of modern-day Ghana, which was also the hometown of his mother. He was born when his mother was going to visit her husband, Owusu Panyin in Esiase to give birth to Osei there, but due to not getting to Esiase in time as planned, she gave birth to Osei in Anyinam. He and his mother stayed there for 40 days before they went back to or Kwaaman

His father was Owusu Panyin, an Akan noble from the Adanse area, who was the chief Esiase. His mother Maanu Kotosii was from Kokofu and was the sister of the hene of the Asantemansu and later Kwaaman, Obiri Yeboa, and his brother, who was either the ruler of the lost Asante city of Asantemansu or the ruler of Kwaaman, Oti Akenten.

It is said that Osei Tutu's mother was barren for many years, and she, her husband and her brother Obiri Yeboa consulted a powerful and famous shrine called Otutu, whose deity was the deity of the river Kakaawere, in the land Akuapem to obtain a blessing so his sister and brother-in-law could have a child, with Kotosii making two promises: 1) She'd reward the river's deity if it allowed her to reach home before she gave birth and 2) she'd also show appreciation to the deity if it allowed her to reach home before she gave birth. She fulfilled her promises by naming her child Tutu, after the shrine. Due to the matrilineal succession the Akan practiced, it meant that Osei Tutu was to be the heir to the Kwaaman throne.

Osei Tutu was of the Oyoko abusua (tribe), an abusua which (according to legend) was formed from the Eukona abusua after a portion of the clan who broke the Eukona abusua taboo and ate the meat of a buffalo. The people were then referred to as Owekuo, or Oyoko: Those who eat buffalo meat.

Time in the Denkyrian court 
Little is known about the childhood of Osei Tutu, but most of what is known and told about his life is from when he turned sixteen. At the age of sixteen, the age where Akan boys were now seen as men, a representative of the Denkyirahene travelled into Kwaaman and demanded that Osei Tutu to come with him. This was not unusual, as the Denkyira had a long-standing practice of holding the heirs to their subordinate kings as hostage to ensure compliance. However, while he was a captive, Osei Tutu was not a prisoner in the traditional sense. Political prisoners like the Osei Tutu were treated with intense respect, thus they have a positive view of the Denkyira when they are eventually released to rule their state. So, rather than being locked in a dungeon, Osei Tutu was essentially a guest in the Denkyirahene's palace, albeit one that was not allowed to leave. In Abankesesso, the capital of the Denkyiraman, Osei Tutu spent his days socializing with Denkyira elites (a few of which would become important during his lifetime), playing Oware and learning immensely about the traditions and customs of the Denkyira court, specifically about the manner of administration and the maintenance of power in the Denkyira court. He proved his worth so effectively and was so respected in the Denkyiran court that he was eventually made a royal shield-bearer

Affair scandal and flight to Akwamu 
However, these were not the only activities Osei Tutu was partaking in Abankesesso. It is said that Osei Tutu, even in his childhood, was a strong, handsome male, with all the marks of Akan royalty. Due to this he easily caught the eye of the ladies of the Denkyiran court, courting many. This was a well know fact about Osei Tutu. However, his fall from grace would be in the form of his relationship with the sister or niece of the Denkyriahene, Princess (Ohene nuabaa) Akobena Abensua. This relationship wasn't just imprudent, but also adulterous as Abensua was married to a high ranking Denkyrian dignitary, who by some accounts was the Gyaasehene, who had been betrothed to her since they were children. It became worse as the princess fell pregnant, and rumors spread like wildfire on who the father actually was, which were true. Due to Akan law, Abensua wouldn't be getting in trouble for this relationship, but Osei Tutu. Due to the punishment of possible execution for this affair, and at the behest of Abensua, he fled to the Akan state furthest east, Akwamu. This affair would later lead to a tragic sequel decades later

Time in Akwamu 
Osei Tutu realised that he couldn't go to his home state of Kwaaman. To do so would certainly bring doom upon his people, who were still subjects of the Denkyirans. Instead, he fled to the Akwamu court of Sasraku I in Akwamufie. There, he begged Sasraku for protection against the Denkyrians. Sasraku took a liking to Osei Tutu. Whether this was due to either him interceding to save the life of a well known diviner (who had angered Sasraku), or to Osei Tutu's own personal beauty, is unclear. The fact that Akwamu were enemies with the Denkyrians, and that around this time the Dormaa, enemies of the Akwamu, had gone to war with the Kwaaman, Osei Tutu's state, could also have contributed to Osei Tutu being taken in by Sasraku, treated well, and being protected from the Denkyirans. Here Osei Tutu learned much about the military organisations of the Akwamu. This Akan state was possessed of the most advanced and powerful military of any Akan state. He also learned about the political and social makeup of Akwamuman, and saw a difference when it came to rulers. Unlike the Kwaaman, who had formed the Amantoo coalition with states under the yoke of the Denkyrians, and whose rule was divided between clans and cities, the Akwamu were centralized, and had one supreme ruler. The unity of the Akwamu, and the highly sophisticated army that the Akwamu had at their disposal, allowed the Akwamu to spread their influence immensely. These factors of what made the Akwamu so successful, as well as Akwamu culture itself, greatly inspired the future reforms of Osei Tutu.

Meeting Okomfo Anokye 
It is unclear at what specific time period is when Osei Tutu met Okomfo Anokye. While some sources say that the two met in Denkyira after it is said that after Anokye and his mother left Akwamu, they settled in Denkyria. Kings of his day courted him. With him on their side, they were sure to hit fresh heights of glory. Anokye's mother had an odd coloring on her hands. Denkyira were going through some difficulties at the time. Their priests blamed it on her and executed her. Anokye was devastated. He looked forward to the day he could inflict similar pain on the Denkyira rulers, with Osei Tutu had the same ambition having observed the ill-treatment of non-Denkyira people, like Anokye's mother. When Osei Tutu fled Denkyira, Okomfo Anokye fled with him. Others say that it was in Akwamu, where some stories state that the two met after Osei Tutu interceded to save the life of Okomfo Anokye when Anokye killed his own grandmother. However, it was certain that by the time Osei Tutu was in Akwamu, the two the two had certainly met a became best friends, becoming inseparable. Okomfo Anokye would aid Osei Tutu in his future war with the Denkyrians and in the making of the Asante Empire using the his spiritual, strong oratorical skills and considerable intellectual and psychological abilities to influence many of the regional states to unite under Osei Tutu and gain military and political strength, which they could use to confront their enemies. Unknown to the two at the time, they were distant cousins

Return to Kwaaman 
After a few years in Akwamu, Osei Tutu received news that his Uncle, Obiri Yeboa, had been killed repelling an attack from the Dormaa. Due to this, Osei Tutu was told to go home to Kwaaman and take on the role of Kwaamanhene. However, due to Osei Tutu still being a wanted fugitive by the Denkyira, he was too scared to go back to Kwaaman, so Ansa Sasraku detached 300 of some of his best Akwamu warriors to guide him to Kwaaman. When the soldiers, Osei Tutu and Okomfo Anokye got to Kwaaman the warriors settled among them and later became citizens of Asafo whilst Osei Tutu and Okomfo Anokye mourned the death of his uncle for a few days, before Osei Tutu was enstooled as Osei Tutu I of Kwaaman

Becoming Kwaamanhene, Kumasehene and Amantoohene 
The state was quite perilous when Osei Tutu took up the throne, with the coalition of the Akan states was greatly fractured. It would've been fully broken up for not Osei Tutu taking up the role of Kwaamanhene. To be able to go to war against the Denkyirans in the future, Osei Tutu needed the full, unrivialled backing of the Amantoo Kings.

Centralization of power 
Creation of the Sika Dwa Kofi

It became clear to Osei Tutu that he must prepare for war as his planned unification of the Amantoo couldn't be made possible until the Denkyrians had been defeated, but he needed to rally the chiefs of Amantoo behind him and him alone to make his much-needed reforms. He spoke of this to his uncles and to the Queen Mother, Manu. After much thought, she advised him to call a great meeting to settle who would be the leader of the Amantoo. This would be done via Anokye, whom was to be called to Kwaaman.

Osei Tutu agreed, and he sent word to Okomfo Anokye via his 'mouth' (The royal linguist).

Why Anokye wasn't with Osei Tutu was unclear. Some reasons have been given, one being that Anokye, in his own time, left Akwamu, traveled to Apedwa and to Akwesiho Kwehu and then to Kwaaman. A more popular reason was because he had been enstooled as the Agonahene, although it is said that he was enstooled Agonahene later Manu knew he would come to Kwaaman to reunite with Osei Tutu, whom he loved and honored, so she decided to make Kwaaman ready for the arrival for the famous Okomfo. So, she sent out, via her servants, for the plants and animals which would be pleasing to the abosom, and she and her women busied themselves with the necessary rites. Then Osei Tutu sent out messengers, summoning his people and those of the Amantoo to Kwaaman telling the messengers to tell the chiefs that the main agenda being the amalgamation of all the Amantooe Chiefs under one paramount Chief whose stool would be greater than all the other stools. He knew in his mind that Okomfo Anokye would in some way have prepared for him a great thing against his enemies.

Concerning the question of who should be chosen as the paramount chief, the great priest and Chief of Agona Okomfo Anokye explained that the problem would be solved by the ancestors and the gods by offering prayers and supplications to them. He said at the end of the prayer, the ancestors and the gods would send a stool from the skies and the chief on whose laps it would descend, and rest would be the chosen paramount chief.

A festive Friday (Fofie) was chosen as the day that all the chiefs would all converge for the gods and ancestors to choose their King from amongst them. They were advised by the great priest Okomfo Anokye to continually fast and pour libation to their ancestors and the gods until the chosen day 

So, for many days thousands of men and women of the Amantoo nation came to Kwaaman, all wearing beads and woven or printed cloths and ornaments of gold and copper and brass. Some wore the well-prepared skins of forest beasts; some wore kilts of palm leaf fiber; many brought food and drink, driving in sheep and goats or carrying sacks of meal and roots, or great calabashes full of palm wine, and gave them to Osei Tutu, who was able in this way to feed all that multitude. The lesser henes came with their queen mothers who were delicately marked with fine blue tattooing so that they were perpetually veiled. The drums sounded all day and all night; dancers danced, and the dust rose between the thick clay walls of the houses of Kwaaman, splendidly decorated with raised patterns, and in the great open space where King Osei Tutu sat with counsellors and drummers and horn blowers, his executioners and his speakers, who when he wished to speak to the people, made themselves his voices.

They carried staves of gold and ivory, splendidly carved into animals and fruits and symbols. But the Kwaamanhene Osei Tutu wore the most wonderful golden ornaments; on his fingers were many weighty rings, each made into some figure about which there was a story or saying. His wrists were weighted down by nobbled gold bracelets, so that he must support his hands on the shoulders of his servants. Round his head was a circlet of pure gold, and his sandals were heavy with golden lumps. His chest was bare so that all could see the strength of his breathing, and round his waist was the cloth woven in thin stripes of many colors which proclaimed him as Amantoohene, just as the Kente worn by his chiefs proclaimed their lineage. His mother, Manu, also wore gold, but she was old, and her hair grey and lost the beauty of her youth, for she had borne many children. Yet for not her, this great festival would not have been set up.

Okomfo Anokye had spoken to them both, the Hene and Queen Mother, in the dark of night. He had spoken of a way of overcoming Denkyira, of making the Amantoo into a great nation, ruler of all the Akan states, trading with the caravans of the north across Bornu and Kanem, and with the new white-faced strangers who were coming into southern courts near the great ocean. Okomfo Anokye had made a dazzling prophecy of riches and power. Manu had agreed first, then her son. They half-knew what was to happen.

On the appointed day, under a calm atmosphere the Chiefs converged and as expected each was anxiously hoping to be the paramount chief elect. Osei Tutu took his spot under a Kum tree. The great priest Okomfo Anokye appeared amidst drumming and dancing, after some magical dances and sacrfices, pausing and then jumping in different directions, Okomfo Anokye began speaking to the Supreme Being, shouting, imploring. The blood of sacrifice steamed up, the drums quickened and quickened. A black cloud seemed to gather; first a few of the people saw it, then more, then all. It was blacker than a thunder cloud, but thunder rumblings came from it. And there came a thick white dust, and then falling, slowly, slowly, turning like a seed, came the stool, with its base sending out three branches to support the shaped top. It glinted with gold, yet it was not entirely golden; below the gold it was carved wood. It fell more and more slowly and at last it came to rest upon Osei Tutu's lap.

Osei Tutu was said to be a brave man, but now he was surprised and he could not put out one hand to touch the thing which had come from deep heaven. But Okomfo Anokye, himself also shaking with effort of the great feat, had made ready elephant hides and cloths and laid them on the ground. He took the Golden Stool, or Sika Dwa Kofi, from the Osei Tutu, and set it on the cloths. Then he chose an albino man with white skin, pale eyes and reddish hair and sat him down on the stool. He touched this man on the head and it is said that his body disappeared utterly. His soul is said to have gone into the Sika Dwa Kofi, in great honor. And ever since that time, no albino person has been put to death in Asante.

Then Okomfo Anokye spoke aloud to the King and to all the people, saying that now the stool had been given a soul, and that now it had itself become the soul of the Ashanti nation and all their power was bound up with it. So, the Amantoohene and Queen Mother, and each of the chiefs and his queen mother, gave hairs from their bodies and parings from the nails from their forefinger, so that their own souls should become one with this great soul. These were powdered and mixed with water and palm wine and many other herbs and barks, and some was poured over the stool, and some was drunk. Anokye then explained what the Golden Stool was and it's functions.

Okomfo Anokye told them that the stool contained the spirit of the Amantoo Nation. No mortal man, not even the Kwaamanhene, sit on this stool. In dire need the Kwaamanhene must seat himself on his own royal stool, resting his arms on the Sika Dwa Kofi. Okomfo Anokye then said that bels were to be made for the stool, two of gold and two of brass, dangling off of the Golden Stool. He said that over the course of the Golden Stool's existence, more objects would be added. The occupant of the Golden stool was to be known as the Amantoohene (later Asantehene) and to be subsequently selected from the lineage of Osei Tutu and Obiri Yeboa. Anokye finally stated that the Stool should have its own attendants and special room. He finished his explanation of the Stool by stating that it was greater than any King.

Anokye then explained that the potion they drank meant that they had sworn to the gods, which meant they had taken an oath of allegiance to unite and forget their past individual histories.  Osei Tutu took the oath of allegiance to the stool and the chiefs, and each chief in turn took an oath of allegiance to Nana Osei Tutu and an oath never to raise arms against the Golden Stool.

Renaming of the capital from Kwaaman to Kumasi

In honor of the creation of the Sika Dwa Kofi, Osei Tutu renamed Kwaaman to Kumase, after the kum tree that Tutu sat under while negotiating the terms and new laws for the land, the same Kum tree grown by Obiri Yeboa when testing the land for his people to inhabit. From then on Osei Tutu would not be known as the Kwaamanhene, but the Kumasehene, showing that change had come to the Amantoo, and that a New Era was a hand for them

Role as Amantoo and Kumasehene 
With the full and undisputed backing of the chiefs of Amantoo behind Osei Tutu, he quickly went about reforming the Amantoo confederacy.

Reforms

Finance reforms 
Osei Tutu's first problem was to sort out the financial situation of his kingdom and confederation, as he planned to use the money to fund his military and pay the soldiers. He set up the Afotosanfoɔ to be responsible for his treasury and provided funds for the royal household. This helped focus the funds of the Amantoo confederacy on helping strengthen the military and raise moral

Military reforms 

Osei Tutu's greatest reforms were that of the military of the Amantoo coalition. Using what he had learned in Akwamu and the Akwamu warriors who were now effectively military advisors, he quickly got to work using his funds and money in the coalition's treasury to improve his military. He promised pay to his soldiers after battle, raising morale and giving the soldiers a reason not just for why they should fight, but why they should try to win.

He also split the army into several components. A scouting regiment tracked enemy forces, sabotaged their paths, and launched guerrilla style sniper attacks. They were originally made up with hunters, who were skilled in the requirements needed for the military component of the scout. The forward guard, composed of the best trained members of the Ashanti army would fiercely attack the enemy, forcing the enemy into a static defensive position. The four wings would then move around the pinned enemy, attempting to encircle the enemy. The main body provided a manpower reserve for whichever part of the army needed reinforcements. Meanwhile, the rear guard of the army sat at the back of the force, protecting against encirclement. Officers and nobility were protected by a specialized group of bodyguards meant to protect these critical people from being hurt or killed in a potential defeat, a call back to the death of Obiri Yeboa. Either later or at the same time a horde of medics, engineers, supply transporters, and foragers, meant to support the army in non-combat matters, were introduced

Finally, he and his military advisors drilled his military in hammer-and-anvil tactics, such as the pincer movement. He and his military advisors had optimized their army for these tactics, as well as to be flexible and fast, with every unit contributing to the hammer-and-anvil tactic.

The widespread use of firearms in the Asante army would take decades to fully implement, with access to firearms in such large numbers for the army being extremely expensive. Many parts of the Asante army that made it one of the most bureaucratized and professionalized armies not just in Africa, but in the entire world at that point, would take decades to fully implement, and wouldn't be finished until the final days of Osei Tutu

Revenge against the Dormaa 
Nevertheless, these quick and much needed reforms introduced by Osei Tutu and his military advisors did have the desired effect of making the Amantoo alliance. When the Dormaa marched into the lands of the Amantoo to once again try to take Kwaaman, the Amantoo military successfully and easily repelled them and then followed it up by completely driving the Dormaa from the lands of Amantoo. The military reforms of Osei Tutu paid off, but at the cost of bringing the Amantoo alliance to the attention of the Denkyirans.

War with Denkyirans

Leadup to the war and cause 
There are many accounts with how the war between the Amantoo and Denkyrians took place. It is generally accepted that the old Denkyriahene, Boamponsem, had died. An in an election to determine the next Denkyriahene Ntim Gyakari, a warrior who was related to Denkyrian royalty, took the throne. However the accounts of what happened before or after differ:

One account states as follows:"When he came to the throne, it was clear to Osei Tutu that there was scheming against him in the capital of Dankyera. Ntim Gyakari was jealous of him and wished to destroy him and his people. Secret messengers came and went through the forest paths, quietly, bringing news. It became clear to Osei Tutu that he must prepare for war"Another account says that the direct cause of the war was a beautiful woman. Boamponsem, out of pride, sent a mission to Osei Tutu composed of his favorite wives. Richly clad and loaded down with jewels, they were accompanied by a magnificent escort of Boamponsem's most stalwart warriors as an indirect way to show the beauty of the Denkyrian women in comparison to those of te Amantoo. This royal delegation was received by Osei Tutu with all the honors and courtesy due its rank. He gave the queens rich and extravagant presents and sent them safely back. In reciprocity, Osei Tutu sent Boamponsem an embassy of his most beautiful wives, led by the chief queen, a woman of extraordinary beauty. When this delegation arrived, Boamponsem received its members with due respect, but fell in love at first sight with the beautiful chief queen. Boamponsem was young and handsome, and the attraction was mutual. On her return, Osei Tutu noticed that she was an expectant mother and swore that he would not rest until he had Boamponsem's head. Boamponsem offered him a large quantity of gold as the price of peace, but Osei Tutu was adamant. He began mobilizing his army, forgetting apparently that he had once been forced to flee from Denkyria for a similar offense.

Another account that is said for one of the causes of the war is that Osei Tutu had given protection to Oduro Agyensamoo of Assin, a man wanted in Abankeseso for questioning the King of Denkyira about the circumstances of Boa Amponsem's death. Most accounts, though, say that Boamponsem was dead by the time, having ruled for around 40 years at that point.

The casus belli most sources agree on for the start of the war was that Ntim Gyakari started to demand higher payments from his tributes, specifically from the Amantoo after hearing of their alliance turn into a union without his consent. He sent ambassadors with a large brass pan and demanded the following:

 That each chief was to cut off one of his fingers and add to the gold dust to be sent to Denkyira.
 That each chief was to send his favorite wife to Denkyira to serve the King's court.
 That they should stop opposing the allowance for Denkyiran men who had sex with the young Amantoo women who went to serve at Denkyira, because to the Denkryiran court it was said a blessing for any woman who became pregnant by a Denkyiran man, since she would get a baby with royal blood in him who would be better fit to occupy a stool in Amantoo.
 That they should dissolve their union because they did not seek permission before its formation.
 That they were to send the Sika Dwa Kofi to him because he was the overlord.

Despite the gold dust payments being the demand that the Amantoo could give to the Denkyirans, the demands for the chiefs to dissolve their union and getting their right to speak out against how Denkykiran men could freely impregnate Amantoo women in Denkyria (akin to rape) were a step to far for the Amantoo, as the chiefs had vowed to protect the spirit of the new nation. To cut off a finger was an unforgivable demand and insult as no maimed person was allowed to occupy a stool in the Amantoo Nation, therefore if that King was demanding their fingers, then he was de-stooling them. The demands for the chiefs to give away their favorite wives was a grave disrespect to Amantoo manhood, and the demand for the Sika Dwa Kofi was the straw that broke the camel's back.

The chiefs were initially silent in responding to the demands, then the Dwabenhene, Adaakwaa Yiadom, rose up, the new sunsum, or soul, of Amantoo stirring within him condemned the whole message and swore to avenge, following it up by either cutting the ear off of or killing one of the envoys. All the other Chiefs unanimously supported him. They therefore filled the brass basin with stones to be sent to King of Denkyira instead of the gold dust he was demanding.  They ordered executioners to cut the fingers of the messengers from Denkyira and add to the stones and to also kill the warrior among the messengers.  Their action was a declaration of war on Denkyira their overlord

Road to war-Amantoo planning 
It is said of the ensuing war that the Amantoo, basking in the glory of the previous feat performed by their great priest and Agonahene, Nana Okomfo Anokye in their previous conquest of the Dormaa people, Okomfo Anokye then told the Amantoo to delay the war for a time, as he set up magical defences. After his preparations were complete, he prophesied that victory was certainly provided three men would have to give themselves up as sacrifices for sacrifices. One would be buried alive with his two hands appearing above ground earth and two brass pans full of war medicine mixed in water would be put in the two palms for the warriors to bath before they left for the war front. The second volunteer would be butchered to death and his flesh thrown away for vultures to take to Denkyira land. Wherever any piece of the flesh would fall the men of that place would lose their bravery and become cowards. The third volunteer should be a paramount chief. He would be armed, and he would be in front of the marching soldiers. He was not to fire a shot even if he met an enemy. He should look on for the enemy to shoot him. It was only when he fell that the Amantoo Nation would be victorious. If he did not conform to that and he shot his gun that would spell doom for the Amantoo Nation.

Those who volunteered were:

 Nana Asenso Kofo, Chief of Adwumkasekese who was buried alive.
 Nana Dikopim I, Chief of Edweso, who was to be butchered to death.
 Nana Tweneboa Kodua, Paramount Chief of Kumawu, who was to lead the marching soldiers, though he was armed, he was forbidden to shoot, therefore he was later killed.

After all the purifications and the necessary preparations, Nana Osei Tutu prepared himself to lead the Nation as War General having had good leadership experience from the war against the Dormaa. But Anokye instructed Nana Osei Tutu to stay at Kumase and requested for another to lead the army, explaining that though Amantoo Nation would win the war, whoever led as the War General would not live beyond seven days after the war. Here Nana Boahen Anantuo, Chief of Mampong, volunteered to lead the soldiers to the war. He, however, asked that since he was taking the place of Amantoohene (later renamed Asantehene) as War General, his stool should be next to that of Amantoohene. Amantoohene was occupying the Golden Stool therefore his state should occupy a Silver Stool, a colour second to gold in the Akan, and his request was unanimously granted. Like Boahen Anantuo, the first three volunteers also made requests. Asenso Kofo requested that his after death, nobody from his town, Adwumakasekese, should ever be killed or sacrificed in any form. Dikopim, the Chief of Edweso, requested that nobody from his clan, Asona, should be sacrificed in any form. Nana Tweneboa Kodua also requested that nobody from his state should ever be sacrificed in any form. As a future reminder of the 4 men's sacrifices, it is said whenever a drummer from any of the Asante states started drumming on Atumpan drums, his appellation should be sounded to remind future generations that they too should sacrifice themselves for the Asante Nation, encouraging patriotism. Anokye also predicted that the Denkyrians would never make it to Kumase.

Osei Tutu and Anokye also engaged in a propaganda campaign, trying to get Denkyrian commanders to defect. It is said by some accounts that the defecting Denkyrian commanders had a minimal effect on the Denkyrian army at best, but in other accounts, it was around half left Denkyria to go and join the Amantoo, as by most accounts Ntim Gyakari was not a good ruler. It is said that the first town that changed allegiance from Ntim Gyakari to Osei Tutu was the Abooso people. Abooso was a town that lay in the vicinity of Adanse Akrokeri and Abankeseso. The inhabitants of this town were called Bontwumafo - the red clay people. The Denkyirahene made ten classes of men and women. These men and women were there to offer their bodies as a sacrifice to the King whenever a member of the royal family passed on. They were called the red clay people as when they were sacrificed, their blood was used as red clay in painting some parts of the body of the deceased and their bodies were placed in the grave on which the coffin was laid. Ntim Gyakari, known as a womanizer, took an Abooso wife. Then his mother, Akobena Abensua, fell mortally ill. Learning of this, the wife went to Abooso to alert her ‘‘Bontwumafo’’ kin. When news came that the King’s mother was dead, the Bontwumafo and the inhabitants of the surrounding towns immediately fled to escape being slaughtered in great numbers and sought refuge with Osei Tutu at Kumasi.

When it was clear that the Bontwumafo were welcomed by Osei Tutu, others from Denkyira followed in numbers. Aboabo was a town near the Oda River. The town was inhabited by Denkyirahene’s shield-bearers (Akyamfuo) and villagers who prospected and panned for gold on the Ofin flats east of Watreso. A conflict arose between the Akyamfuo and the villagers, and during this, the villagers killed some of the shield-bearers. When Ntim Gyakari was told of the matter, he was incensed and summoned the villagers to appear before him. At the meeting the head of the villagers, Owusu Koanyama verbally abused the Occupant of the Bankam Dwa (the Denkyira Stool) saying that the hene’s servants (the shield-bearers) were ruffians who stole everything from the people. King Ntim Gyakari flew in a rage and ordered that Owusu Koanyama should be killed forthwith together with all his family. This was done on the spot. The villagers and the inhabitants of the towns close to Aboabo escaped to Amantoo. However, some then decided among themselves to return to their home and beg the Denkyriahene to forgive them. Ntim Gyakari was preparing to fight the Amantoo and so he killed them. This scared others in exile from returning to their home.

Others of Ntim Gyakari’s household servants who also defected were the brothers Akwadan and Nuamoa, the chief hornblowers of the Denkyirahene. They came to Kumase with their golden horns and their large followers. They were resettled at Asuoyeboa (in Kumase) and later brought into Kumasi when Osei Tutu created the Asokwa (also in Kumase) stool for them so that they might act as his traders as well as his hornblowers. Similarly, the Denkyirahene’s head drummer also fled to Osei Tutu with his sister Boatemaa Twum and many followers. Osei Tutu appointed him as Nkukuwafohene. It is said that serval others fled to Amantoo to seek safety from the tyranny of Ntim Gyakari.

The most important of all those who migrated which drastically reduced Ntim Gyakari’s power and his authority over northern Denkyira was the ‘Inkwayulaes or Nkawie people. Nkawie, 20 miles north of Abankeseso, was the second most important town in the Denkyira Empire. Nkawie was itself a state just like Kumasiman. It was ruled by a lineage that occupied a Stool from which you become the King of Denkyira. Its female stool was also occupied by Denkyirahene’s ‘nieces’, women who were eligible to become the Queenmother of Denkyira. This was to make the enstoolment of Denkyira Kings smoothly after the King’s death, preventing disputes in the Royal family. This is how a Denkyiran noble by the name of Asenso Kufuor. In 1694, after the death of King Boa Amponsem I, Ntim Gyakari won over Asenso Kufuor in the contest to succeed Boa Amponsem. Boaamponsem however, was not from the Denkyira Royal family but came up to take the Denkyira Stool as he was the famous warrior. So after his death, the Denkyirans gave the Bankam Dwa also called Offin Ba (a child of the River Offin) in turn to Ntim Gyakari, his relative and possible son of Osei Tutu. Ntim Gyakari feared Kufuor may overthrow him and ordered Asenso Kufuor and his sister Adoma to reside at Abankeseso under his personal surveillance. Asenso Kufuor not satisfied with Ntim Gyakari’s conditions decided to side with Osei tutu and came to Kwaaman. Since he was a royal eligible to become the King of Denkyira, he came with all his subordinate chiefs together with many guns and gold to supply to the Amantoo. Several Denkyira people including royals also followed him.

When all was set, the Chiefs swore to Nana Osei Tutu that they would forever push forward, never would they retreat. They subsequently buried the Chief of Adwumkasekese, Nana Asenso Kofo alive with his two hands appearing above ground, prepared war medicine, mixed it with water, poured it into two brass pans, had the warriors pour it into their palms to bath and rub themselves and then they went to war

Road to war - Denkyrian planning 
Ntim Gyakari wasn't staying idle as these events happened. He had his own diviner, who went by the name of Kenyeke. Kenyeke informed Gyakari of the steps that Ntim Gyakari was taking. Gyakari ordered Kenyeke to do what was necessary to counter Anokye's magic. The two diviners (Anokye and Kenyeke) worked against one another to try and get an advantage for their side over the other. At one point it is said that Anokye challenged Kenyeke to undo a knot he had tied in an elephant's tusk. Kenyeke returned the favour by challenging Anokye to undo a knot that he had tied in water.

Amantoo- Denkyrian war

Stats 
From the offset of the war, the Amantoo were at a great disadvantage. The Denkyrian soldiers were better equipped than the Amantoo troops, with their gun and ammunition supplies being frequently replenished and craftsmen who could manufacture guns and ammunition, and their troops more experienced in combat than their Amantoo counterparts. Loyalty amongst the Denkyrians to their Denkyriahene was greater than that to Osei Tutu with his own men. Due to this, Gyakari was confident that he'd quickly crush the Amantoo uprising

Events of the initial stages of the war 
Gyakari's confidence was quickly confirmed as his army advanced upon the Amantoo army. At the battles of Adunku and Abuontem, Ntim Gyakari managed to force Amantoo militias back, with these three battles resulting in the Denkyrians as the clear victors. At this point, Nana Dikopim I, Chief of Edweso, was killed. This was either by the Denkyrian soldiers killing him or the Amantoo butchering him to death as the planned sacrifice. Later, at the Amantoo city of Aputuogya, the Denkyrians saw the whole Amantoo army for the first time. Gyakari ordered an attack, which lead the Amantoo army to go on a retreat. It is said that the Amantoo retreated under the leadership of the Mamponghene and at the advice of the diviners for miles, always on the back foot but never breaking. This was until the retreating Amantoo army and the advancing Denkyrian army got to the town of Feyasie

Battle of Feyasie 
At the Amantoo town of Feyasie, the Asante stopped retreating as if they were to retreat any further, it would mean retreating to the Amantoo capital of Kumase. Gyakari, knowing full well that if he was to achieve absolute victory at Feyasie ordered one last final grand assault on the Amantoo forces. However, this was a mistake. For a time, the Amantoo had planned for this, and they then put their plan into action. One legend states that Anokye transformed into a vulture and got a committee of vultures to pick the butchered pieces of Nana Dikopim I and sprinkled the flesh onto the Denkyrian forces. The Vulture Anokye was then to have said to have followed it up by releasing his dropping onto the eyes of Gyakari, greatly or (and most likely) temporarily blinding him. Another story goes that Ankoye managed to finally kill Kenyeke (He was definitely dead by the end of the war). The news of his death so emboldened the Amantoo forces that the Amantoo turned to attack the Denkyrians

However, most accounts and even the two above have the same result. All of this happened directly to Osei Tutu's plan. Gyakari and the Denkyrians had significantly and fatally underestimated the Amantoo army both in size and in tactics, just as Osei Tutu had planned. He had sent out Amantoo scouts to skirmish with the Denkyrians at Adunku and Abuontem to make them believe that they were Amantoo militias. The "whole Amantoo army" the Denkyrians had encountered at Aputuogya were actually the forward guard and main body. The Denkyrians hadn't been pushing the Amantoo back, but reeling them in.

The wings of the Amantoo army, who had been lying in wait in Feyasie, rose from their hiding spaces and poured onto the battlefield. The Denkyrian commanders, seeing the advancing troops of their enemies, attempted to reposition their forces to fight the advancing wings. The forward guard then turned and slammed into the disorganized Denkyrian lines, commencing a brutal assault on the Denkyrian front. This caused the Denkyrians to once again attempt a reorganization of their troops to fight the Amantoo forward guard. However, at this, the wings of the Amantoo army fully encircle the Denkyrian army. This allowed the Amantoo to attack from all sides and to deny the Denkyrians any means of escape. The battle turned into a massacre. Most of the Denkyrian forces were killed. Some were captured and sold into slavery. Those who surrendered were conscripted into the Amantoo army. Only a few managed to successfully flee back to Denkyrian lands

Amongst those captured or, in some interpretations, killed was Ntim Gyakari. The Dwaben Asafo (the Dwaben part of the Amantoo army headed by the Dwabenhene himself) found Gyakari playing golden oware with his wife, blissfully unaware of what was happening on the battlefield due to absolute belief that the Denkyrians would win over the Amantoo. There are many ways stated for how Ntim died. One source says that after him trying to resist his capture, in which the Dwabenhene himself attacked and subdued Gyakari, they captured him and brought him to Osei Tutu, his possible father but the two did not know they were even possibly related. Gyakari's only wish bravely requested that he be executed publicly in front of Osei Tutu himself. His wish was granted. After gulping down a gourd (bottle) of palm wine, King Gyakari of his own volition laid his neck on the executioner's stone to be executed. Other sources state that either the Dwaben Asafo or the Dwabenhene himself killed and beheaded Ntim on the spot. One source states that a man called Adakwayiadom, a Dwaben man, stabbed Ntim to death, the first stab denting a golden bangle Ntim was wearing. This gold bangle would a point of disagreement between the Dwabenhene and Osei Tutu. His last words are also debated as some sources don't state Ntim's last words, whilst some say they were "esa nti"; "because of war". He would've said this because it was because of war with the Denkyiras that the Akan city-states that would form the Asante Union joined together. After his execution, his body was divided into 3 more parts: his head was given to the Amantoohene, but the Osei Tutu got a gold cast of his face and gifted it to the Dwabenhene either as a reward for capturing Gyakari, or because the Dwabenhene and Osei had argued over who got Ntim's head and due to Tutu not wanting infighting amongst the Amantoo he made a gold mask of Ntim's face and gave it to the Dwaben, his left-leg bone to Asumegya, right-leg bone to Mampong, the vertebrae to Aduaben

Becoming the Asante confederacy, contact with the Europeans and expanding territory

Aftermath of the war 
With the Denkyrian army evaporated, the Denkyrian territories were left undefended and exposed. What happened next varies from telling to telling. What is clear is that the Amantoo, Adanse and Twifo descended upon the Denkyrian lands with no mercy, carving out territories for themselves. The lion’s share, though, was taken by the Amantoo. Osei Tutu divided the territory among his supporters, with the people of Asumegya founding the villages of Dominase and Agyemasu, and Osei Tutu resettling the Bontwumafo in Atwima (now Atwima Mponua and Atwima Nwabiagya Districts) and their leader was made the Atwimahene. 

How the Amantoo eventually descended onto either Abankesesso or (possibly) the new capital of Entuam is unclear. Most retellings state that the Amantoo forces descended on the capital of Denkyriaman, Abankesesso, straight after the war's end. Here the Amantoo forces ransacked Abankesesso for all of its worth, with even the working class of Abankesesso being stripped of anything of worth. Other sources say that after the war, there was a lull in hostilities for a year until the Amantoo heard that Boadu Akufu, the new Denkyriahene, was making preparations for reprisals. Under Anokye's prediction that stated that the Asante would crush the uprising, the Amantoo army marched south, encamped close to Entuam and bribed those in Entuam to hand over Boadu, which was a success. Boadu was later executed. It is then said that the Denkyrians were so disheartened at losing Bodu that they fled across the River Ofin, leaving the Amantoo to plunder and destroy Entuam. One thing is clear, however. The Denkyrians were completely ransacked by the war's end in 1707, with vast amounts of war treasure being brought back to Kumase. It is said that the period of plundering went on for 15 consecutive days, with the body of Boamponsem being exhumed, the flesh being removed to feed to serpents and snakes, and his skull and thigh bones being carried off as war trophies, as well as 3 small cannons gifted to Gyakari by the Dutch East India Company to fight the Amantoo. Denkyria would henceforth be under Amantoo influence, with sizeable contingents of military police frequently patrolling the territory of the once great Akan state to ensure the locals felt Amantoo influence. The Denkyrians would never again rise to be the most prominent of the Akan states. In honour of their victory over the Denkyrians, having finally fulfilled the wishes of Oti Akenten and Obiri Yeboa and either due to Gyakari's last words or from the old Amantoo state name of Asantemansu, the Amantoo renamed themselves Asanteman: The Asante empire

Akim 
The Akim were the only Akan state to outwardly side with the Denkyrians against the Asante so not only shared in the losses, but also brought down upon themselves the wrath of the Asante. 2 years after dealing with the Denkyrian army, the Asante military moved on Akim and gained such a decisive victory that the Akim sued for peace. It was granted on the condition that Akim became feudatory to the Asante and paid 2,000 benda's of gold to the Asante (between £887,471- £1,002,079 in 2023 money) as war indemnity. Two Akim chiefs, Kakramsi and Ajumako, "took fetish" and were handed over to the Asante as security for the sum before the Asante army withdrew to Kumase

Death 
In 1717, Osei Tutu was killed in a war against the Akyem. At the onset of the struggle, he had underestimated the Akyem because they were few in number, going into battle without his usual "magical amulets", and even leaving some of his body armor back at Kumasi, his capital. One day, as he was crossing River Pra in a canoe, he was struck by bullets from snipers and sharpshooters, who were hiding in the dense treeline. Asantehene Osei Tutu I died minutes after being shot. His last words were "Ankah me nim a" (If only I knew), an apparent reference to his having underestimated the Akyem.

Till the present day the occupant of the Golden Stool is forbidden to cross River Pra.

Legacy 
Osei Kofi Tutu I and his adviser, Okomfo Anokye, forged the Asante Union from a number of different Abusua groups who submerged their old rivalries and hatred for the common good—the overthrow of their common oppressor, the Denkyira. Skillfully utilizing a combination of spiritual dogma and political skill, and ably supported by military prowess, he tripled the size of the small kingdom of Kumasi which he had inherited from his uncle Obiri Yeboa and laid the foundation for the Empire of Ashanti in the process.

A shrine in Anyinam commemorates the birth of Osei Tutu. The village chief told Gus Casely-Hayford regarding Osei Tutu: "He was more than a man, he was our messiah, brave, intelligent, someone who through almost force of will forged this country. He built a culture, it did not evolve; it was made by a great man."

References and notes

"Osei Tutu (d. 1717)", Black History Pages.
https://archive.today/20040428083020/http://members.tripod.com/~Abyssinia/Africa/OseiTutu.html
"Osei Tutu", Encyclopædia Britannica.
https://web.archive.org/web/20140803212610/http://www.swagga.com/king.htm
http://www.info-ghana.com/ashanti_empire.htm
https://web.archive.org/web/20061124060938/http://www.upstate88.com/blackhistory/page4.html
"The Precolonial Period", in La Verle Berry, ed., Ghana: A Country Study. Washington: GPO for the Library of Congress, 1994.
https://web.archive.org/web/20070807103649/http://www.kumasimetro.org/cc_kma.cfm?tblCADCorpID=33
https://web.archive.org/web/20070928034646/http://www.ashanti.com.au/pb/wp_5e360041.html
"His Majesty The King of Asante Otumfuo Osei Tutu II From Ghana, Makes First Visit to Boston - Wednesday, November 2, 2005"
"Osei Tutu", Ijebu.

1710s deaths
Akan people
Ashanti monarchs
18th-century rulers in Africa
History of Ghana
Deaths by firearm in Ghana
Year of birth unknown
1660s births